The 2013 Baltimore Orioles season was the 113th season in franchise history, the 60th in Baltimore, and the 22nd at Oriole Park at Camden Yards. The Orioles began the 2013 season on April 2 against the Tampa Bay Rays.

The Orioles set team fielding records in the modern era, with the fewest errors in a 162-game season (54) and highest team fielding percentage (.991).

Spring training
The Orioles finished preseason spring training with a 19–9 win–loss record, the best record in the Grapefruit League. This excludes four tie games, which did not count toward the standings.

Roster

Accolades
The following players represented the Orioles in the 2013 Major League Baseball All-Star Game
Chris Davis
J. J. Hardy
Adam Jones
Manny Machado
Chris Tillman

The following players received Gold Glove Awards for the 2013 MLB season
J. J. Hardy
Adam Jones
Manny Machado

The following player received the American League Platinum Glove Award for the 2013 MLB season
Manny Machado

The following players received Silver Slugger Awards for the 2013 MLB season
Chris Davis
J. J. Hardy
Adam Jones

1st baseman Chris Davis won the American League home run championship (53) and RBI championship (138), and set franchise records for home runs and extra-base hits (96).

The Orioles set a major league record for fewest errors in a full season with 54.

Game log

|-  style="text-align:center; background-color:#bbffbb"
| 1 || April 2 || @ Rays || 7–4 || Hammel (1–0) ||  McGee (0–1) || J. Johnson (1)  || Tropicana Field || 34,078 || 1–0 || W1
|-  style="text-align:center; background-color:#ffbbbb"
| 2 || April 3 || @ Rays || 7–8 || Rodney (1–0) ||  Hunter (0–1) || || Tropicana Field || 15,599 || 1–1 || L1
|-  style="text-align:center; background-color:#bbffbb"
| 3 || April 4 || @ Rays || 6–3 || González (1–0) || Hernández (0–1) || J. Johnson (2) || Tropicana Field || 17,491 || 2–1 || W1
|-  style="text-align:center; background-color:#bbffbb"
| 4 || April 5 || Twins || 9–5 || Ayala (1–0) || Fien (0–1) ||  || Camden Yards || 46,653 || 3–1 || W2
|-  style="text-align:center; background-color:#ffbbbb"
| 5 || April 6 || Twins || 5–6 || Roenicke (1–0) ||  J. Johnson (0–1) ||  Perkins (1) || Camden Yards || 40,704  || 3–2 || L1
|-  style="text-align:center; background-color:#ffbbbb"
| 6 || April 7 || Twins || 3–4 || Swarzak (1–0) || Hammel (1–1) || Perkins (2) || Camden Yards || 34,431 || 3–3 || L2
|-  style="text-align:center; background-color:#ffbbbb"
| 7 || April 8 || @ Red Sox || 1–3 || Buchholz (2–0) || Chen (0–1) || Hanrahan (3) || Fenway Park || 37,008 || 3–4 || L3
|-  style="text-align:center; background-color:#bbffbb"
| 8 || April 10 || @ Red Sox || 8–5 || O'Day (1–0) || Hanrahan (0–1) || J. Johnson (3) || Fenway Park || 30,862 || 4–4 || W1
|-  style="text-align:center; background-color:#bbffbb"
| 9 || April 11 || @ Red Sox || 3–2 || Matusz (1–0) || Mortensen (0–1) || J. Johnson (4) || Fenway Park || 27,704 || 5–4 || W2
|-  style="text-align:center; background-color:#ffbbbb"
| 10 || April 12 || @ Yankees || 2–5 || Sabathia (2–1) || González (1–1) || Rivera (2)  || Yankee Stadium || 35,033 || 5–5 || L1
|-  style="text-align:center; background-color:#bbffbb"
| 11 || April 13 || @ Yankees || 5–3 || Hammel (2–1) || Hughes (0–2)  || J. Johnson (5) || Yankee Stadium || 41,851 || 6–5 || W1
|-  style="text-align:center; background-color:#ffbbbb"
| 12 || April 14 || @ Yankees || 0–3 || Kuroda (2–1) || Chen (0–2) || || Yankee Stadium || 34,154 || 6–6 || L1
|-  style="text-align:center; background-color:#bbffbb"
| 13 || April 16 || Rays || 5–4 || Arrieta (1–0) || Hernández (0–3) || J. Johnson (6) || Camden Yards || 14,670 || 7–6 || W1
|-  style="text-align:center; background-color:#ffbbbb"
| 14 || April 17 || Rays || 2–6 || Moore (3–0) || Tillman (0–1) ||  || Camden Yards || 13,591 || 7–7 || L1
|-  style="text-align:center; background-color:#bbffbb"
| 15 || April 18 || Rays || 10–6 (10) || Patton (1–0) || Wright (0–1) ||  || Camden Yards|| 13,986 || 8–7 || W1
|-  style="text-align:center; background-color:#bbbbbb"
| – || April 19 || Dodgers || colspan=8| Postponed (rain).  Makeup date April 20 as part of doubleheader.
|-  style="text-align:center; background-color:#bbffbb"
| 16 || April 20 || Dodgers || 7–5 || O'Day (2–0) || Rodriguez (0–1) || J. Johnson (7) || Camden Yards || 26,811 || 9–7 || W2
|-  style="text-align:center; background-color:#bbffbb"
| 17 || April 20 || Dodgers || 6–1 || Chen (1–2) || Beckett (0–3) || Hunter (1) || Camden Yards || 45,248 || 10–7 || W3
|-  style="text-align:center; background-color:#ffbbbb"
| 18 || April 21 || Dodgers || 4–7 || Howell (1–0) || Arrieta (1–1) ||  League (5) || Camden Yards || 41,265 || 10–8 || L1
|-  style="text-align:center; background-color:#bbffbb"
| 19 || April 22 || Blue Jays || 2–1 || J. Johnson (1–1) || Loup (1–2) ||  || Camden Yards || 11,168 || 11–8 || W1
|-  style="text-align:center; background-color:#bbffbb"
| 20 || April 23 || Blue Jays || 4–3 || González (2–1) || Dickey (2–3) || J. Johnson (8) || Camden Yards || 13,272 || 12–8 || W2
|-  style="text-align:center; background-color:#ffbbbb"
| 21 || April 24 || Blue Jays || 5–6 (11) || Rogers (1–1) || J. Johnson (1–2) || Janssen (6) || Camden Yards || 14,981 || 12–9 || L1
|-  style="text-align:center; background-color:#bbffbb"
| 22 || April 25 || @ Athletics || 10–2 || Hammel (3–1) || Parker (0–4) ||  || O.co Coliseum || 11,220 || 13–9 || W1
|-  style="text-align:center; background-color:#bbffbb"
| 23 || April 26 || @ Athletics || 3–0 || Chen (2–2) || Milone (3–2) || J. Johnson (9) || O.co Coliseum || 16,944 || 14–9 || W2
|-  style="text-align:center; background-color:#bbffbb"
| 24 || April 27 || @ Athletics || 7–3 || Tillman (1–1) || Griffin (2–2) || J. Johnson (10) || O.co Coliseum || 31,292 || 15–9 || W3
|-  style="text-align:center; background-color:#ffbbbb"
| 25 || April 28 || @ Athletics || 8–9 (10) || Blevins (1–0) || Strop (0–1) ||  || O.co Coliseum || 27,475 || 15–10 || L1
|-  style="text-align:center; background-color:#ffbbbb"
| 26 || April 29 || @ Mariners || 2–6 || Saunders (2–3) || Britton (0–1) ||  || Safeco Field || 9,818 || 15–11 || L2
|-  style="text-align:center; background-color:#bbffbb"
| 27 || April 30 || @ Mariners || 7–2 || Hammel (4–1) || Maurer (2–4) ||  || Safeco Field || 13,629 || 16–11 || W1
|-

|-  style="text-align:center; background-color:#ffbbbb"
| 28 || May 1 || @ Mariners || 3–8 || Harang (1–3) || Chen (2–3) ||  || Safeco Field || 12,936 || 16–12 || L1
|-  style="text-align:center; background-color:#bbffbb"
| 29 || May 2 || @ Angels || 5–1 || Tillman (2–1) || Blanton (0–5) ||  || Angel Stadium of Anaheim || 35,118 || 17–12 || W1
|-  style="text-align:center; background-color:#ffbbbb"
| 30 || May 3 || @ Angels || 0–4 || Vargas (1–3) || González (2–2) ||  ||Angel Stadium of Anaheim || 40,140 || 17–13 || L1
|-  style="text-align:center; background-color:#bbffbb"
| 31 || May 4 || @ Angels || 5–4 (10) || Hunter (1–1) || Richards (1–3) || J. Johnson (11) || Angel Stadium of Anaheim || 32,136 || 18–13 || W1
|-  style="text-align:center; background-color:#bbffbb"
| 32 || May 5 || @ Angels || 8–4 || Hammel (5–1) || Williams (1–1) || O'Day (1) || Angel Stadium of Anaheim || 38,047 || 19–13 || W2
|-  style="text-align:center; background-color:#bbffbb"
| 33 || May 7 || Royals || 4–3 || Hunter (2–1) || Collins (1–1) || J. Johnson (12) || Camden Yards || 12,921 || 20–13 || W3
|-  style="text-align:center; background-color:#bbffbb"
| 34 || May 8 || Royals || 5–3 || Tillman (3–1) || Mendoza (0–2) || J. Johnson (13) || Camden Yards || 12,344 || 21–13 || W4
|-  style="text-align:center; background-color:#ffbbbb"
| 35 || May 9 || Royals || 2–6 || Guthrie (5–0) || García (0–1) ||  || Camden Yards || 23,282 || 21–14 || L1
|-  style="text-align:center; background-color:#bbffbb"
| 36 || May 10 || @ Twins || 9–6 (10) || Hunter (3–1) || Swarzak (1–1) || J. Johnson (14) || Target Field || 31,360 || 22–14 || W1
|-  style="text-align:center; background-color:#ffbbbb"
| 37 || May 11 ||  @ Twins || 5–8 || Worley (1–4) || S. Johnson (0–1) || Burton (1) || Target Field || 32,221 || 22–15 || L1
|-  style="text-align:center; background-color:#bbffbb"
| 38 || May 12 ||  @ Twins || 6–0 || Chen (3–3) || Diamond (3–3)||  || Target Field  || 34,320 || 23–15 || W1
|-  style="text-align:center; background-color:#ffbbbb"
| 39 || May 14 || Padres || 2–3 || Gregerson (2–2) || J. Johnson (1–3) || Street (9) || Camden Yards || 19,096 || 23–16 || L1
|-  style="text-align:center; background-color:#ffbbbb"
| 40 || May 15 || Padres || 4–8 || Marquis (5–2) || García (0–2) ||  || Camden Yards || 32,418 || 23–17 || L2
|-  style="text-align:center; background-color:#ffbbbb"
| 41 || May 17 || Rays || 10–12 || Hellickson (2–2) || Hammel (5–2) || Peralta (1) || Camden Yards || 38,061 || 23–18 || L3
|-  style="text-align:center; background-color:#ffbbbb"
| 42 || May 18 || Rays || 6–10 || Torres (1–0) || J. Johnson (1–4) ||  || Camden Yards || 34,685 || 23–19 || L4
|-  style="text-align:center; background-color:#ffbbbb"
| 43 || May 19 ||Rays || 1–3 || Moore (8–0) || Tillman (3–2) || Rodney (8) || Camden Yards || 37,704 || 23–20 || L5
|-  style="text-align:center; background-color:#ffbbbb"
| 44 || May 20 || Yankees || 4–6 (10) || Robertson (3–0) || Strop (0–2) || Rivera (17) || Camden Yards || 24,133 || 23–21 || L6
|-  style="text-align:center; background-color:#bbffbb"
| 45 || May 21 || Yankees || 3–2 (10) || J. Johnson (2–4) || Nuño (1–1) ||  || Camden Yards || 29,040 || 24–21 || W1
|-  style="text-align:center; background-color:#bbffbb"
| 46 || May 22 || Yankees || 6–3 || Hammel (6–2) || Kuroda (6–3) ||  || Camden Yards || 26,725 || 25–21 || W2
|-  style="text-align:center; background-color:#ffbbbb"
| 47 || May 23 || @ Blue Jays || 6–12 || Morrow (2–3)|| Gausman (0–1) ||  || Rogers Centre || 21,466 || 25–22 || L1
|-  style="text-align:center; background-color:#bbffbb"
| 48 || May 24 || @ Blue Jays || 10–6 || Tillman (4–2) || Nolin (0–1) ||  || Rogers Centre || 25,104 || 26–22 || W1
|-  style="text-align:center; background-color:#bbffbb"
| 49 || May 25 || @ Blue Jays || 6–5 || García (1–2)  || Dickey (4–6) || J. Johnson (15) || Rogers Centre || 35,915 || 27–22 || W2
|-  style="text-align:center; background-color:#ffbbbb"
| 50 || May 26 || @ Blue Jays || 5–6 || Delabar (4–1) || J. Johnson (2–5) ||  || Rogers Centre || 28,502 || 27–23 || L1
|-  style="text-align:center; background-color:#bbffbb"
| 51 || May 27 || @ Nationals || 6–2 ||Hammel (7–2) || Gonzalez (3–3) ||  || Nationals Park || 41,260 || 28–23 || W1
|-  style="text-align:center; background-color:#ffbbbb"
| 52 || May 28 || @ Nationals  || 3–9 || Duke (1–1) || Gausman (0–2) ||  || Nationals Park || 35,664 || 28–24 || L1
|-  style="text-align:center; background-color:#bbffbb"
| 53 || May 29 || Nationals || 9–6 || S. Johnson (1–1) || Zimmermann (8–3) || J. Johnson (16) || Camden Yards || 39,129 || 29–24 || W1
|-  style="text-align:center; background-color:#bbffbb"
| 54 || May 30 || Nationals || 2–0 || García (2–2) || Haren (4–6)|| J. Johnson (17) || Camden Yards || 30,665 || 30–24 || W2
|-  style="text-align:center; background-color:#bbffbb"
| 55 || May 31 || Tigers || 7–5 || O'Day (3–0)|| Valverde (0–1)||  || Camden Yards  || 46,249 || 31–24 || W3
|-

|-  style="text-align:center; background-color:#ffbbbb"
| 56 || June 1 || Tigers || 3–10 || Verlander (7–4) || Hammel (7–3) ||  || Camden Yards  || 38,945 || 31–25 || L1
|-  style="text-align:center; background-color:#bbffbb"
| 57 || June 2 || Tigers || 4–2 || Matusz (2–0) ||  Porcello (2–3) || J. Johnson (18) || Camden Yards || 39,182 || 32–25 || W1
|-  style="text-align:center; background-color:#bbffbb"
| 58 || June 4 || @ Astros || 4–1 || Tillman (5–2) || Harrell (4–7) || J. Johnson (19) || Minute Maid Park  || 15,920 || 33–25 || W2
|-  style="text-align:center; background-color:#ffbbbb"
| 59 || June 5 || @ Astros || 7–11 || Keuchel (3–2) || García (2–3) ||  || Minute Maid Park  || 15,526 || 33–26 || L1
|-  style="text-align:center; background-color:#bbffbb"
| 60 || June 6 || @ Astros || 3–1 || González (3–2) || Norris (5–5) || J. Johnson (20) || Minute Maid Park || 14,664 || 34–26 || W1
|-  style="text-align:center; background-color:#ffbbbb"
| 61 || June 7 || @ Rays || 1–2 || Archer (1–1) || Hammel (7–4) || Rodney (13) || Tropicana Field  || 13,256  || 34–27 || L1
|-  style="text-align:center; background-color:#ffbbbb"
| 62 || June 8 || @ Rays || 0–8 || Hellickson (4–2) || Gausman (0–3) ||  || Tropicana Field  || 21,834 || 34–28 || L2
|-  style="text-align:center; background-color:#bbffbb"
| 63 || June 9 || @ Rays || 10–7 || Tillman (6–2) || Moore (8–2) || J. Johnson (21) || Tropicana Field  || 19,921 || 35–28 || W1
|-  style="text-align:center; background-color:#bbffbb"
| 64 || June 10 || Angels || 4–3 || García (3–3) || Weaver (1–2) || J. Johnson (22)  || Camden Yards  || 15,514 || 36–28 ||W2
|-  style="text-align:center; background-color:#bbffbb"
| 65 || June 11 || Angels || 3–2 ||González (4–2) || Vargas (5–4) || J. Johnson (23) || Camden Yards  || 22,834 || 37–28 ||W3
|-  style="text-align:center; background-color:#ffbbbb"
| 66 || June 12 || Angels || 5–9 || Williams (5–2) || Strop (0–3) ||  || Camden Yards  || 25,964 || 37–29 || L1
|-  style="text-align:center; background-color:#bbffbb"
| 67 || June 13 || Red Sox || 5–4 (13) || McFarland (1–0) || Wilson (1–1) ||  || Camden Yards  || 20,098 || 38–29 || W1
|-  style="text-align:center; background-color:#bbffbb"
| 68 || June 14 || Red Sox || 2–0 || Tillman (7–2) || Dempster (4–7) || J. Johnson (24) || Camden Yards  || 39,158 || 39–29 ||W2
|-  style="text-align:center; background-color:#ffbbbb"
| 69 || June 15 || Red Sox || 4–5 || Lackey (4–5) || García (3–4) || Bailey (8) || Camden Yards  || 42,422 || 39–30 || L1
|-  style="text-align:center; background-color:#bbffbb"
| 70 || June 16 || Red Sox || 6–3 || González (5–2) || Lester (6–4) || J. Johnson (25) || Camden Yards  ||  41,311 || 40–30 ||W1
|-  style="text-align:center; background-color:#ffbbbb"
| 71 || June 17 || @ Tigers || 1–5 || Scherzer (10–0) || Arrieta (1–2) || Smyly (2) || Comerica Park || 32,525 || 40–31 || L1
|-  style="text-align:center; background-color:#bbffbb"
| 72 || June 18 || @ Tigers || 5–2 || Britton (1–1) || Verlander (8–5) || J. Johnson (26)|| Comerica Park  || 34,706 || 41–31 ||W1
|-  style="text-align:center; background-color:#bbffbb"
| 73 || June 19 || @ Tigers || 13–3 || Tillman (8–2) || Porcello (4–4) ||  || Comerica Park  || 38,574 || 42–31 || W2
|-  style="text-align:center; background-color:#ffbbbb"
| 74 || June 21 || @ Blue Jays || 6–7 || Janssen (2–0) || Matusz (2–1) ||  || Rogers Centre  || 35,472 || 42–32 || L1
|-  style="text-align:center; background-color:#ffbbbb"
| 75 || June 22 || @ Blue Jays || 2–4 || Oliver (3–1) || González (5–3) || Janssen (17) || Rogers Centre  || 43,261  || 42–33 || L2
|-  style="text-align:center; background-color:#ffbbbb"
| 76 || June 23 || @ Blue Jays || 5–13 || Johnson (1–2) || García (3–5) ||  || Rogers Centre  || 45,214 || 42–34 || L3
|-  style="text-align:center; background-color:#ffbbbb"
| 77 || June 24 || Indians || 2–5 || Jiménez (6–4) || Britton (1–2) || Pestano (4) || Camden Yards  || 18,544 || 42–35 || L4
|-  style="text-align:center; background-color:#bbffbb"
| 78 || June 25 || Indians || 6–3 || Tillman (9–2) || Masterson (9–6) || J. Johnson (27) || Camden Yards  || 20,924 || 43–35 || W1
|-  style="text-align:center; background-color:#ffbbbb"
| 79 || June 26 || Indians || 3–4 || Smith (4–0) || J. Johnson (2–6) || Pestano (5) || Camden Yards  || 18,082 || 43–36 || L1
|-  style="text-align:center; background-color:#bbffbb"
| 80 || June 27 || Indians || 7–3 || González (6–3) || Kluber (6–5) ||  || Camden Yards  || 33,036 || 44–36 || W1
|-  style="text-align:center; background-color:#bbffbb"
| 81 || June 28 || Yankees || 4–3 || Gausman (1–3) || Sabathia (8–6) || Hunter (2) || Camden Yards  || 40,041 || 45–36 || W2
|-  style="text-align:center; background-color:#bbffbb"
| 82 || June 29 || Yankees || 11–3 || Britton (2–2) || Phelps (5–5) ||  || Camden Yards  || 46,607 || 46–36 || W3
|-  style="text-align:center; background-color:#bbffbb"
| 83 || June 30 || Yankees || 4–2 || Tillman (10–2) || Kuroda (7–6) || J. Johnson (28) || Camden Yards || 40,878 || 47–36 ||W4
|-

|-  style="text-align:center; background-color:#ffbbbb"
| 84 || July 2 || @ White Sox || 2–5 || Danks (2–5) || Hammel (7–5) || Reed (22) || U.S. Cellular Field  || 19,746 || 47–37 || L1
|-  style="text-align:center; background-color:#bbffbb"
| 85 || July 3 ||  @ White Sox || 4–2 || O'Day (4–0) || Lindstrom (2–3) || J. Johnson (29) || U.S. Cellular Field  ||26,001  || 48–37 ||W1
|-  style="text-align:center; background-color:#ffbbbb"
| 86 || July 4 ||  @ White Sox || 2–3 || Reed (4–1) || Hunter (3–2) ||  || U.S. Cellular Field  || 21,321 || 48–38 || L1
|-  style="text-align:center; background-color:#ffbbbb"
| 87 || July 5 || @ Yankees || 2–3 || Nova (3–2) || J. Johnson (2–7) ||  || Yankee Stadium  || 43,396  || 48–39 || L2
|-  style="text-align:center; background-color:#ffbbbb"
| 88 || July 6 || @ Yankees || 4–5 || Pettitte (6–6) || Tillman (10–3) || Rivera (29) || Yankee Stadium || 42,678 || 48–40 || L3
|-  style="text-align:center; background-color:#bbffbb"
| 89 || July 7 || @ Yankees || 2–1 || O'Day (5–0) || Rivera (1–2) || J. Johnson (30) || Yankee Stadium || 40,218 || 49–40 || W1
|-  style="text-align:center; background-color:#ffbbbb"
| 90 || July 8 || Rangers || 5–8 || Holland (7–4) || Feldman (7–7) || Nathan (30) || Camden Yards  || 24,619 || 49–41 || L1
|-  style="text-align:center; background-color:#ffbbbb"
| 91 || July 9 || Rangers || 4–8 || Pérez (3–1) || Britton (2–3) ||  || Camden Yards  || 29,160 || 49–42 || L2
|-  style="text-align:center; background-color:#bbffbb"
| 92 || July 10 || Rangers || 6–1 || Chen (4–3) || Lindblom (1–3) ||  || Camden Yards  || 19,344 || 50–42 || W1
|-  style="text-align:center; background-color:#bbffbb"
| 93 || July 11 || Rangers || 3–1 || González (7–3) || Wolf (1–2) || J. Johnson (31) || Camden Yards  || 21,857 || 51–42 || W2
|-  style="text-align:center; background-color:#bbffbb"
| 94 || July 12 || Blue Jays || 8–5 || Tillman (11–3) || Buehrle (5–6) || J. Johnson (32) || Camden Yards  || 42,660 || 52–42 || W3
|-  style="text-align:center; background-color:#ffbbbb"
| 95 || July 13 || Blue Jays || 3–7 || Loup (4–3) || Hammel (7–6) || Janssen (18) || Camden Yards  || 46,150 || 52–43 || L1
|-  style="text-align:center; background-color:#bbffbb"
| 96 || July 14 || Blue Jays || 7–4 || Feldman (8–7) || Johnson (1–5) || J. Johnson (33) || Camden Yards  || 34,748 || 53–43 ||W1
|-  style="text-align:center; background-color:#bbcaff"
| ASG || July 16 || All-Star Game || AL 3–0 NL || Sale || Corbin || Nathan || colspan="3" |Citi Field, Flushing, New York City, NY  ||
|-  style="text-align:center; background-color:#bbffbb"
| 97 || July 19 || @ Rangers || 3–1 || Chen (5–3) || Holland (8–5) || J. Johnson (34) || Rangers Ballpark in Arlington  || 40,068 || 54–43 ||W2
|-  style="text-align:center; background-color:#bbffbb"
| 98 || July 20 || @ Rangers || 7–4 || González (8–3) || Wolf (1–3) || J. Johnson (35) || Rangers Ballpark in Arlington  || 41,660 || 55–43 || W3
|-  style="text-align:center; background-color:#bbffbb"
| 99 || July 21 || @ Rangers || 4–2 || Tillman (12–3) || Perez (3–3) || O'Day (2) || Rangers Ballpark in Arlington  || 39,907 || 56–43 || W4
|-  style="text-align:center; background-color:#bbffbb"
| 100 || July 22 || @ Royals || 9–2 || Feldman (9–7) || Davis (4–9) ||  || Kauffman Stadium  || 16,362 || 57–43 ||W5
|-  style="text-align:center; background-color:#ffbbbb"
| 101 || July 23 || @ Royals || 2–3 || Chen (4–0) || Hammel (7–7)|| Holland (25) || Kauffman Stadium  || 19,072 || 57–44 ||L1
|-  style="text-align:center; background-color:#ffbbbb"
| 102 || July 24 || @ Royals || 3–4 || Hochevar (3–1) || O'Day (5–1) ||  || Kauffman Stadium  || 17,410 || 57–45 ||L2
|-  style="text-align:center; background-color:#ffbbbb"
| 103 || July 25 || @ Royals || 1–7 || Guthrie (10–7) || González (8–4) ||  || Kauffman Stadium || 17,675 || 57–46 ||L3
|-  style="text-align:center; background-color:#bbffbb"
| 104 || July 26 || Red Sox || 6–0 || Tillman (13–3) || Lackey (7–8) ||  || Camden Yards  || 39,063 || 58–46 ||W1
|-  6tyle="text-align:center; background-color:#ffbbbb"
| 105 || July 27 || Red Sox || 3–7 || Dempster (6–8) || Feldman (9–8) ||  || Camden Yards  || 44,765 || 58–47 || L1
|-  style="text-align:center; background-color:#ffbbbb"
| 106 || July 28 || Red Sox || 0–5 || Lester (10–6) || Hammel (7–8) ||  || Camden Yards  || 32,891 || 58–48 || L2
|-  style="text-align:center; background-color:#bbffbb"
| 107 || July 30 || Astros || 4–3 || Chen (6–3) || Harrell (5–11) || J. Johnson (36) || Camden Yards  || 24,904 || 59–48 || W1
|-  style="text-align:center; background-color:#ffbbbb"
| 108 || July 31 || Astros || 0–11 || Oberholtzer (1–0) || González (8–5) ||  || Camden Yards  || 25,265 || 59–49 || L1
|-

|-  style="text-align:center; background-color:#bbffbb"
| 109 || August 1 || Astros || 6–3 || Norris (7–9) || Lyles (4–5) || J. Johnson (37) || Camden Yards  || 17,909 || 60–49 || W1
|-  style="text-align:center; background-color:#bbffbb"
| 110 || August 2 || Mariners || 11–8 || Tillman (14–3) || Harang (5–10) || J. Johnson (38) || Camden Yards || 25,947 || 61–49 || W2
|-  style="text-align:center; background-color:#ffbbbb"
| 111 || August 3 || Mariners || 4–8 || Ramírez (3–0) || Feldman (9–9) || Farquhar (1) || Camden Yards  || 35,231 || 61–50 || L1
|-  style="text-align:center; background-color:#ffbbbb"
| 112 || August 4 || Mariners || 2–3 || Saunders (10–10) || Chen (6–4) || Farquhar (2) || Camden Yards  || 30,759 || 61–51 || L2
|-  style="text-align:center; background-color:#bbffbb"
| 113 || August 6 || @ Padres || 4–1 || Norris (8–9) || Vólquez (8–9) || J. Johnson (39) || Petco Park  || 28,055 || 62–51 || W1
|-  style="text-align:center; background-color:#bbffbb"
| 114 || August 7 || @ Padres || 10–3 || Rodríguez (2–1) || Gregerson (5–6) ||  || Petco Park  || 21,206 || 63–51 || W2
|-  style="text-align:center; background-color:#bbffbb"
| 115 || August 9 || @ Giants || 5–2 (10) || J. Johnson (3–7) || López (1–2) || Hunter (3) || AT&T Park || 41,434 || 64–51 || W3
|-  style="text-align:center; background-color:#ffbbbb"
| 116 || August 10 || @ Giants || 2–3 || Moscoso (1–0) || Chen (6–5) || Romo (28) || AT&T Park || 41,315 || 64–52 || L1
|-  style="text-align:center; background-color:#bbffbb"
| 117 || August 11 || @ Giants || 10–2 || Patton (2–0) || Cain (7–8) ||  || AT&T Park  || 41,622 || 65–52 || W1
|-  style="text-align:center; background-color:#ffbbbb"
| 118 || August 12 || @ Diamondbacks || 6–7 || Ziegler (6–1) || O'Day (5–2) ||  || Chase Field || 18,889 || 65–53 || L1
|-  style="text-align:center; background-color:#ffbbbb"
| 119 || August 13 || @ Diamondbacks || 3–4 (11) || Bell (3–1) || McFarland (1–1) ||  || Chase Field || 20,036 || 65–54 || L2
|-  style="text-align:center; background-color:#ffbbbb"
| 120 || August 14 || @ Diamondbacks || 4–5 (14) || Bell (4–1) || Norris (8–10) ||  || Chase Field || 19,568 || 65–55 || L3
|-  style="text-align:center; background-color:#ffbbbb"
| 121 || August 16 || Rockies || 3–6 || Nicasio (7–6) || Chen (6–6) ||  || Camden Yards  || 31,438 || 65–56 || L4
|-  style="text-align:center; background-color:#bbffbb"
| 122 || August 17 || Rockies || 8–4 || Norris (9–10) || Bettis (0–2) ||  || Camden Yards || 31,089 || 66–56 || W1
|-  style="text-align:center; background-color:#bbffbb"
| 123 || August 18 || Rockies || 7–2 || Feldman (10–9) || Chacín (11–7) ||  || Camden Yards || 22,238 || 67–56 || W2
|-  style="text-align:center; background-color:#ffbbbb"
| 124 || August 19 || Rays || 3–4 || Price (7–5) || Tillman (14–4) || Rodney (28) || Camden Yards || 25,044  || 67–57 || L1
|-  style="text-align:center; background-color:#ffbbbb"
| 125 || August 20 || Rays  || 4–7 || Cobb (8–2) || González (8–6) || Rodney (29) || Camden Yards || 26,158 || 67–58 || L2
|-  style="text-align:center; background-color:#bbffbb"
| 126 || August 21 || Rays  || 4–2 || Chen (7–6) || Hellickson (10–7) || Hunter (4) || Camden Yards || 28,323 || 68–58 || W1
|-  style="text-align:center; background-color:#bbffbb"
| 127 || August 23 || Athletics || 9–7 || Rodríguez (3–1) || Cook (5–3) || J. Johnson (40) || Camden Yards || 36,761 || 69–58 || W2
|-  style="text-align:center; background-color:#ffbbbb"
| 128 || August 24 || Athletics || 1–2 || Parker (10–8) || O'Day (5–3) || Balfour (32) || Camden Yards || 33,834 || 69–59 || L1
|-  style="text-align:center; background-color:#bbffbb"
| 129 || August 25 || Athletics || 10–3 || Feldman (11–9) || Gray (1–2) ||  || Camden Yards || 33,820 || 70–59 || W1
|-  style="text-align:center; background-color:#ffbbbb"
| 130 || August 27 || @ Red Sox || 2–13 || Doubront (10–6) || Chen (7–7) ||  || Fenway Park || 36,226 || 70–60 || L1
|-  style="text-align:center; background-color:#ffbbbb"
| 131 || August 28 || @ Red Sox|| 3–4 || Breslow (4–2) || Hunter (3–3) || Uehara (14) || Fenway Park || 31,962 || 70–61 || L2
|-  style="text-align:center; background-color:#bbffbb"
| 132 || August 29 || @ Red Sox || 3–2 || Tillman (15–4) || Lester (12–8) || J. Johnson (41) || Fenway Park || 33,300 || 71–61 || W1
|-  style="text-align:center; background-color:#ffbbbb"
| 133 || August 30 || @ Yankees || 5–8 || Sabathia (12–11) || González (8–7) || Rivera (39) || Yankee Stadium || 45,169 || 71–62 ||L1
|-  style="text-align:center; background-color:#ffbbbb"
| 134 || August 31 || @ Yankees || 0–2 || Nova (8–4) || Feldman (11–10) ||  || Yankee Stadium || 42,836 || 71–63 ||L2
|-

|-  style="text-align:center; background-color:#bbffbb"
| 135 || September 1 || @ Yankees || 7–3 || Gausman (2–3) || Kelley (4–2) ||  || Yankee Stadium || 40,361 || 72–63 ||W1
|-  style="text-align:center; background-color:#bbffbb"
| 136 || September 2 || @ Indians || 7–2 || Norris (10–10) || Masterson (14–10) ||  || Progressive Field || 15,020 || 73–63 ||W2
|-  style="text-align:center; background-color:#ffbbbb"
| 137 || September 3 || @ Indians || 3–4 || Jiménez (10–9) || Tillman (15–5) ||  || Progressive Field || 9,962 || 73–64 ||L1
|-  style="text-align:center; background-color:#ffbbbb"
| 138 || September 4 || @ Indians || 4–6 || Shaw (3–3)|| Gausman (2–4) || Perez (22) || Progressive Field || 11,522 || 73–65 ||L2
|-  style="text-align:center; background-color:#bbffbb"
| 139 || September 5 ||  White Sox || 3–1 || González (9–7) || Quintana (7–6) || J. Johnson (42) || Camden Yards || 17,383 || 74–65 ||W1
|-  style="text-align:center; background-color:#bbffbb"
| 140 || September 6 || White Sox || 4–0 || Feldman (12–10) || Danks (4–12) ||  || Camden Yards|| 26,253 || 75–65 ||W2
|-  style="text-align:center; background-color:#bbffbb"
| 141 || September 7 || White Sox || 4–3 (10)|| Hunter (4–3) || Reed (5–3) ||  || Camden Yards || 23,653 || 76–65 ||W3
|-  style="text-align:center; background-color:#ffbbbb"
| 142 || September 8 || White Sox || 2–4 || Rienzo (2–1) || Norris (10–11) || Reed (37) || Camden Yards || 32,042 || 76–66 ||L1
|-  style="text-align:center; background-color:#bbffbb"
| 143 || September 9 || Yankees || 4–2 || Tillman (16–5) || Sabathia (13–12) || J. Johnson (43) || Camden Yards || 17,456 || 77–66 ||W1
|-  style="text-align:center; background-color:#ffbbbb"
| 144 || September 10 || Yankees || 5–7 || Warren (2–2) || Gausman (2–5) || Rivera (42) || Camden Yards || 25,697 || 77–67 || L1
|-  style="text-align:center; background-color:#ffbbbb"
| 145 || September 11 || Yankees || 4–5 || Robertson (5–1) || Hunter (4–4) || Rivera (43) || Camden Yards || 20,141 || 77–68 || L2
|-  style="text-align:center; background-color:#ffbbbb"
| 146 || September 12 || Yankees || 5–6 || Rivera (6–2) || J. Johnson (3–8) ||  || Camden Yards || 24,659 || 77–69 || L3
|-  style="text-align:center; background-color:#bbffbb"
| 147 || September 13 || @ Blue Jays || 5–3 || Hunter (5–4) || Delabar (5–4) || J. Johnson (44) || Rogers Centre || 20,024 || 78–69 || W1
|-  style="text-align:center; background-color:#ffbbbb"
| 148 || September 14 || @ Blue Jays || 3–4 || Jeffress (1–0) || Tillman (16–6) || Janssen (30) || Rogers Centre || 29,942 || 78–70 || L1
|-  style="text-align:center; background-color:#bbffbb"
| 149 || September 15 || @ Blue Jays || 3–1 || González (10–7) || Buehrle (11–9) || J. Johnson (45) || Rogers Centre || 22,331 || 79–70 || W1
|-  style="text-align:center; background-color:#bbffbb"
| 150 || September 17 || @ Red Sox || 3–2 || Hunter (6–4) || Uehara (4–1) || J. Johnson (46) || Fenway Park || 35,030 || 80–70 || W2
|-  style="text-align:center; background-color:#bbffbb"
| 151 || September 18 || @ Red Sox || 5–3 (12) || McFarland (2–1) || Morales (2–2) || J. Johnson (47) || Fenway Park || 38,540 || 81–70 || W3
|-  style="text-align:center; background-color:#ffbbbb"
| 152 || September 19 || @ Red Sox || 1–3 || Lackey (10–12) || Tillman (16–7) ||  || Fenway Park || 36,436 || 81–71 || L1
|-  style="text-align:center; background-color:#ffbbbb"
| 153 || September 20 || @ Rays || 4–5 (18) || Hellickson (12–9) || Norris (10–12) ||  || Tropicana Field || 21,247 || 81–72 || L2
|-  style="text-align:center; background-color:#ffbbbb"
| 154 || September 21 || @ Rays || 1–5 || Cobb (10–3) || González (10–8) ||  || Tropicana Field || 23,835 || 81–73 || L3
|-  style="text-align:center; background-color:#ffbbbb"
| 155 || September 22 || @ Rays || 1–3 || Gomes (3–1) || Feldman (12–11) || Rodney (36) || Tropicana Field || 28,974 || 81–74 || L4
|-  style="text-align:center; background-color:#ffbbbb"
| 156 || September 23 || @ Rays || 4–5 || Peralta (3–8) || Hunter (6–5) ||  || Tropicana Field || 17,830 || 81–75 || L5
|-  style="text-align:center; background-color:#993333"
| 157 || September 24 || Blue Jays || 2–3 (10) || Santos (1–1) || Rodríguez (3–2) || Janssen (34) || Camden Yards || 16,772 || 81–76 || L6
|-  style="text-align:center; background-color:#bbffbb"
| 158 || September 25 || Blue Jays || 9–5 || McFarland (3–1) || Rogers (5–9) || Hammel (1) || Camden Yards || 23,698 || 82–76 || W1
|-  style="text-align:center; background-color:#bbffbb"
| 159 || September 26 || Blue Jays || 3–2 || González (11–8) || Buehrle (12–10) || J. Johnson (48) || Camden Yards || 27,498 || 83–76 || W2
|-  style="text-align:center; background-color:#ffbbbb"
| 160 || September 27 || Red Sox || 3–12 || Buchholz (12–1) || Feldman (12–12) ||  || Camden Yards || 30,774 || 83–77 || L1
|-  style="text-align:center; background-color:#bbffbb"
| 161 || September 28 || Red Sox || 6–5 || Gausman (3–5) || Tazawa (5–4) || J. Johnson (49) || Camden Yards || 36,556 || 84–77 || W1
|-  style="text-align:center; background-color:#bbffbb"
| 162 || September 29 || Red Sox || 7–6 || McFarland (4–1) || De La Rosa (0–2) || J. Johnson (50) || Camden Yards || 44,230 || 85–77 || W2
|-

Season standings

American League East

American League Wild Card

Record vs. opponents

Detailed records

Farm system

References

External links

2013 Baltimore Orioles season at Official site 
2013 Baltimore Orioles season at Baseball Reference

Baltimore Orioles seasons
Baltimore Orioles
Baltimore Orioles